Forth Dimension Displays (ForthDD) is a British optoelectronics company based in Dalgety Bay, Fife, United Kingdom.

Company overview 

Founded in 1998 as Micropix and known later as CRL Opto and CRLO Displays, ForthDD makes high resolution microdisplays and spatial light modulators (SLM). The microdisplays are used in near-to-eye (NTE) applications for the military training and simulation, medical imagery, virtual reality and high definition image processing industries. The SLMs are used for structured light projection in 3D optical metrology and 3D super resolution microscopy. Headquartered in Dalgety Bay, Scotland, ForthDD also operates sales offices in the United States, Germany and Japan, and a customer support office in Germany. Previously funded by venture capitalists, in January 2011 ForthDD was acquired by Kopin Corporation, a NASDAQ listed company based in Taunton, Massachusetts, USA.

Technology 

ForthDD's microdisplays and SLMs are based on a proprietary, high-speed, ferroelectric liquid crystal on silicon (LCOS) platform, protected by a number of patents. For the generation of colour and greyscale, ForthDD's microdisplays use a process called Time Domain Imaging (TDI™). This process involves rendering the red, green and blue colour components which make up an image sequentially over time at high speed. This happens so fast that the human visual system integrates the components into a single, full colour image. This enables the microdisplays to use the same pixel mirror for all three colour components, and avoids the artifacts associated with sub-pixels.

LCOS Technology History

The first LCOS device originated in 1973, followed by a development of a liquid-crystal light valve ten years later. It was not until 1993, that a microdisplay with a resolution sufficient for use as a display was reported by DisplayTech (now Citizen Finedevices). It was capable of full red–green–blue image generation, enabled by the use of a fast-switching ferroelectric liquid crystal.

During the early part of the 21st century, many microdisplay manufacturers focused on applying the technology to rear-projection-based high-definition television (HDTV) systems. However, due to developments in the manufacturing process of large-panel Liquid Crystal Display Televisions (LCD TVs) and resulting drops in the cost of components, LCD based TVs matured into the more popular consumer choice. By late 2007 almost all microdisplay Rear Projection Television (RPTV) manufacturers had withdrawn their TVs from production.

As a result, a number of microdisplay manufacturers either disappeared completely or started working on other technologies. Some companies diversified, whilst others concentrated on a niche market instead.

Products 

ForthDD is a supplier of microdisplays for Near-To-Eye (NTE) applications and spatial light modulators for fringe projection systems.

ForthDD supplies full colour, all digital QXGA (2048 × 1536), SXGA (1280 × 1024) and WXGA (1280 × 768) microdisplays. These products are available as chipsets and board level based products.

Applications 

ForthDD's microdisplays are typically used in the following application areas: Training and Virtual Environments, Medical Systems and Electronic Viewfinders (EVFs). Later system developments have allowed ForthDD to enter markets such as 3D Optical Metrology and, using phase modulation, Super-resolution microscopy.

Training and Virtual Environments

ForthDD's microdisplays can be found in various training and simulation applications across military and civilian environments within devices such as virtual binoculars, monocular viewers and most commonly, immersive HMDs (for example, in NVIS HMDs). By using HMDs to immerse the user in the virtual 3D environment, different scenarios, which may be too dangerous or expensive to replicate in the real world, can be explored.

Medical systems

Microdisplays can be used in high-end medical/surgical microscopes in order to either replace the optical image or overlay data on the image (e.g. an MRI scan). When combined with a microdisplay the microscope becomes a more powerful tool and permits users to navigate the desired surface in real time with a very high degree of accuracy. Other medical applications include viewing systems such as endoscopes.

Film and Television

ForthDD's microdisplays are used in Electronic Viewfinders (EVFs) for HD digital cinema cameras. ARRI uses ForthDD's technology in its EVFs.

3D Optical Metrology

ForthDD's microdisplays are used for fringe projection and confocal inspection in non-contact surface quality inspection systems (for example, in Sensofar products).

References

External links 
 Forth Dimension Displays

Display technology
Liquid crystal displays
Companies based in Fife
Companies established in 1998